Brims is a village at the southern point of the island of Hoy, in Orkney, Scotland. The settlement is within the parish of Walls and Flotta. The RNLI lifeboat Thomas McCunn is on display at the Longhope Lifeboat Museum in Brims.

References

External links

Longhope Lifeboat Museum Trust
SSE - Brims Tidal Array
Canmore - Hoy, Chapel of Brims
Canmore - Hoy, Brims, The Skeo Broch

Villages in Orkney
Hoy